Paweł Spisak (born 29 September 1981 in Koszalin) is a Polish equestrian. At the 2004, 2008, 2012 and 2016 Summer Olympics he competed in the Individual eventing.

References

External links
sports-reference
Official site

Polish male equestrians
1981 births
Living people
Olympic equestrians of Poland
Equestrians at the 2004 Summer Olympics
Equestrians at the 2008 Summer Olympics
Equestrians at the 2012 Summer Olympics
Equestrians at the 2016 Summer Olympics
People from Koszalin
Sportspeople from West Pomeranian Voivodeship